Maoist Communist Party is the name of a political party that may refer to:

Maoist Communist Party (Turkey)
Maoist Communist Party of China
Maoist Communist Party of Manipur

See also
List of communist parties, which include many ideologically Maoist parties